The Estonian Orthodox Church of the Moscow Patriarchate (EOC-MP;) is a semi-autonomous church in the canonical jurisdiction of the Patriarchate of Moscow whose primate is appointed by the Holy Synod of the latter.

This church numbers roughly 150,000 faithful in 31 congregations and is the largest Eastern Orthodox church in Estonia. The primate of the church was Cornelius (Jakobs), Metropolitan of Tallinn and All Estonia, from 1992 to his death in 2018. Since 2018 the head of this church is Metropolitan Eugene (Reshetnikov).

Under Estonian law, another church – the Estonian Apostolic Orthodox Church (Eesti Apostlik-Õigeusu Kirik) – is the legal successor to the pre-World War II Estonian Orthodox Church, which in 1940 had had over 210,000 faithful, three bishops, 156 parishes, 131 priests, 19 deacons, two monasteries, and a theological seminary, the majority of the faithful were ethnic Estonians. The EAOC's primate is confirmed by the Orthodox Church of Constantinople and numbers about 20,000 faithful in 60 congregations today. The reactivation of this autonomous Estonian Orthodox Church caused the Russian Orthodox Church to sever full communion with the Patriarchate of Constantinople in 1996 for several months.

History

Orthodox missionaries from Novgorod and Pskov were active among the Estonians in the southeast regions of the area, closest to Pskov, in the 10th through 12th centuries. As a result of the Northern Crusades in the  beginning of the 13th century, Estonia fell under the control of Western Christianity. However, Russian merchants were later able to set up small Orthodox congregations in several Estonian towns. One such congregation was expelled from the town of Dorpat (Tartu) by the Germans in 1472, who martyred their priest, Isidor, along with a number of Orthodox faithful (the group is commemorated on January 8).Little is known about the history of the church in the area until the 17th and 18th centuries, when many Old Believers fled there from Russia to avoid the liturgical reforms introduced by Patriarch Nikon of Moscow.

In the 18th and 19th centuries, Estonia was a part of the Imperial Russian Empire, having been conquered by the emperor Peter the Great.  A significant number of Estonian peasants were converted to the Orthodox faith in the (unfulfilled) hope of obtaining land, and numerous Eastern Orthodox churches were built.  In 1850 the Diocese of Riga (in Latvia) was established by the Russian Orthodox Church and many Estonian Orthodox believers were included.  In the late 19th century, a wave of Russification was introduced, supported by the Russian hierarchy but not by the local Estonian clergy.  The Cathedral of St. Alexander Nevsky in Tallinn and the Pühtitsa Convent (Pukhtitsa) in Kuremäe in East Estonia were also built around this time.

In 1917 the first Estonian, Platon (Paul Kulbusch), was ordained Bishop of Riga and Vicar of Tallinn.

After the Estonian Republic was proclaimed in 1918, the Patriarch of the Russian Orthodox Church, St. Tikhon, in 1920 recognised the Orthodox Church of Estonia (OCE) as being independent. Archbishop Aleksander Paulus was elected and ordained as the head of the Estonian church.  Soon after, the Estonian church lost contact with Moscow due to the intense religious persecution of the Russian Orthodox Church by the new Leninist regime. In September 1922 the Council of the Estonian Apostolic Orthodox Church took the decision to address the Patriarch of Constantinople, Meletius IV (Metaxakis) of Constantinople, with a petition to adopt the Estonian Orthodox Church under the jurisdiction of the Patriarchate of Constantinople and to declare it autocephalous. Later on the Metropolitan of Tallinn and all Estonia Alexander wrote that it was done under an intense pressure of the state.  On 7 July 1923 in Constantinople Meletios Metaxakis presented the Tomos on the adoption of Estonian Orthodox Church under the jurisdiction of the Patriarchate of Constantinople as a separate church autonomy "Estonian Orthodox Metropolia".

At the suggestion of the Patriarchate of Constantinople, Estonia was divided into three dioceses, Tallinn, Narva and Pechery. Evsevy (Drozdov) became the head of Narva cathedra. John (Bulin), a graduate of St. Petersburg Theological Academy, became Bishop of Pechery in 1926. He headed the diocese until 1932 and left it because of the disagreements on the properties of the Pskov-Pechery Monastery. Bishop John spent several years in Yugoslavia and came back to Estonia in the late 1930s. He actively backed the return of the Estonian Orthodox Church to the jurisdiction of the Moscow Patriarchate. On 18 October 1940, Bishop John was arrested by the NKVD in Pechery, accused of anti-Soviet agitation and propaganda, and was executed on 30 July 1941 in Leningrad.

Before 1941, one fifth of the total Estonian population (who had been mostly Lutheran since the Reformation in the early 16th century when the country was controlled by the Teutonic Order) were Orthodox Christians under the Patriarchy of Constantinople.  There were 158 parishes in Estonia and 183 clerics in the Estonian church.  There was also a Chair of Orthodoxy in the Faculty of Theology at the University of Tartu. There was a Pskovo-Pechorsky Monastery in Petseri, two convents—in Narva and Kuremäe, a priory in Tallinn and a seminary in Petseri. The ancient monastery in Petseri was preserved from the mass church destruction that occurred in Soviet Russia.

Occupation
In 1940, Estonia became a constituent republic of the Soviet Union, whose government undertook a general programme of the dissolution of all ecclesiastical independence within its territory.  From 1942 to 1944, however, autonomy under Constantinople was temporarily revived.  In 1945, a representative of the Moscow Patriarchate dismissed the members of the OCE synod who had remained in Estonia and established a new organisation, the Diocesan Council.  Orthodox believers in the Estonian Soviet Socialist Republic were thus subordinated to being a diocese within the Russian Orthodox Church.

Soon after Nazi Germany attacked the Soviet Union, Metropolitan Alexander declared his break-up with Moscow and reunion with the Patriarchate of Constantinople. Bishop Paul of Narva remained loyal to the Moscow Patriarchate. During their occupation, the Germans didn't hamper Metropolitan Alexander to lead the life of his parishes and Bishop Paul to be in charge of the Russian diocese in Narva and many other parishes loyal to Russian Orthodox Church.

Not long before the Soviet Army entered Tallinn, Metropolitan Alexander left Estonia, the Synod of Estonian Apostolic Orthodox Church addressed Alexy (Simansky), Metropolitan of Leningrad and Novgorod, with a petition to resume the jurisdiction of the Moscow Patriarchate.

Just before the Soviet occupation in 1944 and the dissolution of the Estonian synod, the primate of the church, Metropolitan Aleksander, went into exile along with 21 clergymen and about 8,000 Orthodox believers. The Orthodox Church of Estonia in Exile with its synod in Sweden continued its activity according to the canonical statutes, until the restoration of Estonian independence in 1991.  Before he died in 1953, Metr. Aleksander established his community as an exarchate under Constantinople.  Most of the other bishops and clergy who remained behind were exiled to Siberia.  In 1958, a new synod was established in exile, and the church was organized from Sweden.

Estonian independence

Following the breakup of the Soviet Union, divisions within the Orthodox community in Estonia arose between those who wished to remain under Russian authority and those who wished to return to the jurisdiction of the Ecumenical Patriarchate, with the dispute often taking place along ethnic lines, many Russians having immigrated to Estonia during the Soviet occupation.  Lengthy negotiations between the two patriarchates failed to produce any agreement.

In 1993, the synod of the Orthodox Church of Estonia in Exile was re-registered as the autonomous Orthodox Church of Estonia, and on February 20, 1996, Ecumenical Patriarch Bartholomew I renewed the tomos granted to the OCE in 1923, restoring its canonical subordination to the Ecumenical Patriarchate.  This action brought immediate protest from the Estonian-born Patriarch Alexei II of the Moscow Patriarchate, which regarded his native Estonia as part of his canonical territory and the Patriarch of Moscow removed the name of the Ecumenical Patriarch from the diptychs in 1996 for several months (see 1996 Moscow–Constantinople schism).

An agreement was reached in which local congregations could choose which jurisdiction to follow.  The Orthodox community in Estonia, which accounts for about 14% of the total population, remains divided, with the majority of faithful (mostly ethnic Russians) remaining under Moscow. A U.S. Department of State report from November 2003, about 20,000 believers (mostly ethnic Estonians) in 60 parishes are part of the autonomous church, with 150,000 faithful in 31 parishes, along with the monastic community of Pühtitsa, paying traditional allegiance to Moscow.

On 6 November 2000 Archbishop Cornelius became Metropolitan of Tallinn and All Estonia.

On 19 April 2018 Metropolitan Cornelius reposed.

In 2018 Archbishop Eugene (Reshetnikov), was elected Metropolitan of Tallinn and All Estonia. He began his role as the Primate of the Estonian Orthodox Church of the Moscow Patriarchate on June 17, 2018.

In 2022 Church officials condemned 2022 Russian invasion of Ukraine and speech of Patriarch Kirill of Moscow by September 25, 2022.

References

Sources
Blackwell Dictionary of Eastern Christianity, pp. 183–4
The Estonian Apostolic Orthodox Church by Ronald Roberson, a Roman Catholic priest and scholar
This article incorporates text from the OrthodoxWiki. Please edit and expand it.

External links
Estonian Orthodox Church of the Moscow Patriarchate
Estonian Orthodox Church of Moscow Patriarchate  - History
Estonian Orthodox Church (EP) - History
Orthodox Estonia (EP)
 The History Files Churches of Estonia

Eastern Orthodoxy in Estonia
Christian organizations established in 1993
Eastern Orthodox organizations established in the 20th century
1993 establishments in Estonia
Eastern Orthodox Church bodies in Europe
Dioceses established in the 20th century
Russians in Estonia
Self-governed churches of the Russian Orthodox Church